Munawara Bibi Baloch is a Pakistani politician who had been a member of the National Assembly of Pakistan from August 2018 till January 2023. She is also the head of the party's provincial women's wing.

Political career

She was elected to the National Assembly of Pakistan as a candidate of Pakistan Tehreek-e-Insaf (PTI) on a reserved seat for women from Balochistan in 2018 Pakistani general election.

References

Living people
Women members of the National Assembly of Pakistan
Pakistani MNAs 2018–2023
Pakistan Tehreek-e-Insaf MNAs
Year of birth missing (living people)
21st-century Pakistani women politicians